Jean Alexander Heinrich Clapier de Colongue (–) was a Baltic German marine engineer and founder of a theory of magnetic deviation for magnetic compasses, living and working in Imperial Russia.

Biography 
Ivan Petrovich de Collong was born in 1839 in Dünaburg (now Daugavpils) into a Baltic German noble family originally of Franco-Portuguese origin. He studied at the Naval Academy in Saint Petersburg and from 1870 he worked there as a lecturer. Starting in 1878 he was head of the Navy's Main Hydrographical Administration. In 1875, he constructed a deflector (a new type of compass baffle) and later improved upon its design.

De Collong was a Corresponding Member of the Russian Academy of Sciences (from 1896) and a Major-General of the Imperial Russian Navy. He was awarded the Lomonosov Prize of the Russian Academy of Sciences.

See also 
 List of Russian inventors
 List of Baltic German scientists

References

External links 
Memoirs of Alexei Krylov 
  Genealogy handbook of Baltic nobility Clapier de Colongue's 

1839 births
1901 deaths
People from Daugavpils
People from Dvinsky Uyezd
Baltic-German people
People from the Russian Empire of French descent
Russian people of Portuguese descent
Russian inventors
Russian engineers
Imperial Russian Navy personnel
Marine engineers
Corresponding members of the Saint Petersburg Academy of Sciences